Escape Theme Park was an outdoor theme park located inside NTUC Downtown East, Pasir Ris in Singapore. It was opened in May 2000 and a water park named Wild Wild Wet located adjacent to it was opened in June 2004. Its slogan is "360 degrees of fun". The theme park operates on Saturdays, Sundays, gazetted school and public holidays. It had been a non-smoking park from 2005 until it ceased operations on 26 November 2011 for redevelopment. In 2012, reports confirmed that the park would make way for an expansion of Wild Wild Wet.

History
The Government of Singapore have planned to have a first integrated theme park in Singapore. So therefore they were placed a name called Escape Theme Park to be located at Pasir Ris, Singapore which is at NTUC Downtown East which is announced somewhere in 1997. So they started construction in 1998 and were to initially opened in 2000. And later it was opened in May 2000 with 17 rides.

Between 2005 and 2010, 5 of the following rides have been removed from amusement park which cause problems from Singaporeans and as well as some accidents. Panasonic Alpha 8 have been closed due to an accident in December 2005. Revolution was closed in 2007 due to Singaporean complaints, Flipper and Inverter was closed in 2009 due to Singaporean complaints and used for future use and Rainbow was closed due to an accident in Liseberg, Sweden on 15 July 2008 but was closed in 2009 and removed in 2010.

Attractions
The park featured an equal mix of thrill rides and family rides. Some thrill rides include a pirate ship, 2 go kart tracks, 1 of which is catered to younger riders, fairground style rides, a walk-through haunted house, as well as the highest log flume in Asia. There used to be an indoor roller coaster, but was closed to the public after an incident in 2005.

There are also numerous family attractions such as bumper boats, a family coaster, a Ferris wheel and a central pavilion with many funfair-style games.

Accident
On 2 December 2005, two girls were critically injured after being thrown from the subsequently discontinued "Alpha 8" Roller Coaster and falling 3 metres. The cause of the incident is thought to be a faulty safety restraint.

Closure
With effect from 26 November 2011, Escape Theme Park has ceased operations. NTUC Club, the parent company of Escape Theme Park said that the theme park will be redeveloped to meet the changing needs of guests. The land which Escape Theme Park was on has been used to expand Wild Wild Wet and  Costa Sands Resort. Escape Theme Park had entertained more than four million people since it opened in 2000.

Awards and accolades
2007 Accredited Pro-Family Business

See also
Wild Wild Wet
Downtown East

References

External links
Escape Theme Park Website

Demolished buildings and structures in Singapore
2000 establishments in Singapore
Tourist attractions in Singapore
Amusement parks in Singapore
Pasir Ris
2011 disestablishments in Singapore
Amusement parks opened in 2000
Amusement parks closed in 2011
Defunct amusement parks in Singapore